Limited Edition 2004 is a compilation album by the British neo-soul composer and multi-instrumentalist Lewis Taylor, released in 2004.

Track listing
Intro - 2:22
Back Together - 4:20
Consider - 4:23
Party (Prog Version) - 7:04
No Hope in Here - 6:20
Lovelight (West Coast Version) - 5:46
Can You Feel It - 4:30
I Don't Care This Time Around - 4:53
Morning Light (Prog Version) - 5:50
Keep Right On (Pop Version) - 4:33
UK digital version bonus tracks
Throw Me A Line 2 - 4:07
Lucky (Acoustic Version) - 4:59
Track (Acoustic Version) - 4:12
Song (Acoustic Version) - 2:25
If I Lay Down With You (Acoustic Version) - 3:15
Ghosts (David Sylvian) - 3:51
US digital version bonus tracks
Carried Away 2 - 4:10
From the Day We Met, Pt. 2 - 4:44 (originally from the 2002 release Stoned, Part I)
Throw Me A Line 2 - 4:07
Send Me an Angel 2 - 4:46 (originally from the 2004 release The Lost Album)
'Back Together' is replaced with 'Back Together 2' on the US digital version

All tracks written and composed by Lewis Taylor except where noted.

References

2005 albums
Lewis Taylor albums